Brighty of the Grand Canyon is a 1953 children's novel by Marguerite Henry and a 1966 film of the same name based on the novel. They present a fictionalized account of a real-life burro named "Brighty", who lived in the Grand Canyon of the Colorado River from about 1892 to 1922.<ref>{{cite book|title=Brighty: Of the Grand Canyon|isbn=0689714858|last1=Henry|first1=Marguerite|year=1953}}</ref>

Book and film
Henry penned her novel after she read an article about Brighty in Sunset Magazine''. It won the 1956 William Allen White Children's Book Award.

Thomas McKee, the former manager of Wiley's Camp on the North Rim of the Canyon, read Henry's novel and wrote to express his interest in the book. McKee told Henry that his son, Bob, was Brighty's closest companion. He sent Henry a photograph of young Bob McKee sitting on Brighty's back. Bob became the composite character Homer Hobbs, played in the film by Dandy Curran.

The other film characters include Old Timer, a prospector played by Dick Foran, and Uncle Jim Owen, a man of the Old West played by Joseph Cotten. Pat Conway appears as Jake Irons, who murders Old Timer for his copper ore. Uncle Jim then proceeds to help bring Irons to justice. Theodore Roosevelt was played by Karl Swenson. Parts of the film were shot at the Colorado River in Utah and the Grand Canyon in Arizona.

Brighty's monument

Brighty is honored with a bronze statue in the lobby of Grand Canyon Lodge, a National Historic Landmark, located near Arizona State Route 67 approximately 43 miles south of the junction with U.S. Route 89 alternate route. The sculpture is by artist Peter Jepsen.

See also
Platero

References

1953 children's books
1953 American novels
American children's novels
Novels by Marguerite Henry
Novels set in Arizona
Novels about horses
Children's novels about animals
American novels adapted into films
Films based on American novels
1967 films
1967 Western (genre) films
Films set in Flagstaff, Arizona
Fictional donkeys
Films shot in Utah
Films shot in Arizona
Works about the Grand Canyon
1960s English-language films